Riverstone is an electoral district of the Legislative Assembly in the Australian state of New South Wales. It has been  represented by Kevin Conolly of the Liberal Party since 2011.

Riverstone is a 73 km² urban and semi-rural electorate in Sydney's north west, taking in the suburbs of Acacia Gardens, Angus, Grantham Farm, Kellyville Ridge, Nirimba Fields, Parklea, Richards, Riverstone, Schofields, Stanhope Gardens, Tallawong, The Ponds and parts of Glenwood, Marsden Park, Quakers Hill, Rouse Hill and Vineyard.

Much of the electorate is situated in the growing north-west sector, which has been poorly served in transport, health and police resources. Although ancestrally a  seat, changing demographics in the eastern portion of the seat (Glenwood, Parklea, Acacia Gardens, Stanhope Gardens, Kellyville Ridge, The Ponds, Rouse Hill) suggested a long-term  trend in voting patterns.  Proving this, Liberal Kevin Conolly won the seat in 2011 on a swing of 30.2 percent—almost unheard of in Australian politics—turning the seat from safe Labor to very safe Liberal in one stroke.

Members for Riverstone

Election results

References

Riverstone
Riverstone
Electoral District of Riverstone
City of Blacktown